The AARP Movies for Grownups Awards are awards given out to "champion films made by and for grownups." Given annually by the AARP, they began in 2002 with the goal of encouraging Hollywood to make more movies by and about people over the age of 50. The first awards were announced in an issue of AARP the Magazine, before transitioning to an annual ceremony in 2006. Since 2018, the awards have been telecast throughout the United States on PBS.

History
The first Movies for Grownups awards were announced in a 2002 issue of AARP the Magazine, recognizing films released in 2001. The first award for Best Movie for Grownups was given to Lantana, while Best Director was awarded to Robert Altman for Gosford Park. The awards are chosen by the editors of AARP the Magazine, and all winners and nominees must be at least fifty years old. The original trophy was called La Chaise d'Or, and was a golden statue in the shape of a movie theater chair.

The awards transitioned to a live ceremony in 2006, with that year's event being hosted at the Bel-Air Hotel by Angela Lansbury and Shelley Berman. That year, the award for Best Movie for Grownups was given to Capote.

Starting in 2007, an annual Career Achievement Award was added as part of the ceremony.

In 2015, for the first time, the awards were telecast locally on Los Angeles's KTLA station. In 2018, AARP began an ongoing arrangement to broadcast the awards on PBS as part of the Great Performances series. That year's awards were hosted by Alan Cumming, with Best Movie for Grownups going to Star Wars: The Last Jedi.

The first award for a TV movie was given to Hell on Heels: The Battle of Mary Kay in 2003. TV awards were later discontinued, until the 2021 ceremony, when AARP added new categories to recognize achievement in television as well as film. That year's ceremony was held virtually due to the COVID-19 pandemic, with a limited selection of awards announced in a televised ceremony hosted by Hoda Kotb.

Categories

Current Categories - Film
 Best Movie for Grownups: since 2002
 Best Director: since 2002
 Best Actor: since 2002
 Best Actress: since 2002
 Best Documentary: since 2002
 Best Foreign Language Film: since 2002
 Best Screenwriter: since 2003
 Best Intergenerational Film: since 2003
 Best Time Capsule: since 2003 
 Best Grownup Love Story: since 2003 
 Best Supporting Actor: since 2008
 Best Supporting Actress: since 2008
 Best Buddy Picture: since 2008 
 Best Ensemble: since 2018

Current Categories - Television
 Best TV Movie/Limited Series: 2003-2006, 2021-
 Best Series: since 2021
 Best Actress: since 2021
 Best Actor: since 2021

Discontinued Categories
 Best Movie for Grownups Who Refuse to Grow Up: 2002-2017
 Best Comedy: 2006-2017
 Breakthrough Achievement: 2003-2015
 Reader's Choice: 2020

Footnotes

References

 
Movies for Grownups Awards
American film awards
Awards established in 2002